Balsham Road railway station served Balsham and Fulbourn in Cambridgeshire. It closed in 1851, along with its line (the Newmarket and Chesterford Railway) which was one of the earliest line closures in England.

References

External links
 Balsham Road station at disused-stations.org

Disused railway stations in Cambridgeshire
Former Great Eastern Railway stations
Railway stations in Great Britain opened in 1848
Railway stations in Great Britain closed in 1851
1848 establishments in England
1851 disestablishments in England